Krystyna Nadolna (born 23 December 1949) is a former Polish female discus thrower. She represented Poland at the 1972 Summer Olympics.

References 

1949 births
Living people
Athletes (track and field) at the 1972 Summer Olympics
Olympic athletes of Poland
People from Brodnica County